{{Infobox sports team
| name         = ALTERNATE aTTaX
| short_name   = ATN
| logo         = Alternate aTTaX logo.png
| logo_size    =
| alt          =
| caption      =
| city         = Dresden
| location     = Germany
| parent_group = 
| founded      = 
| folded       =
| history      = 
| ceo          = Christian Rose
| manager      = Stephan "Scars" Barth
| partners     =
| sport_label  = Divisions
| sport        = Counter-Strike: Global OffensiveFIFA
| website      = 
| footnotes    =
| fanclub      =
}}

Alternate aTTaX (stylized ALTERNATE aTTaX) is a professional esports organization owned by German e-commerce company . The team was established in August 2003 and made its first appearance at the Games Convention later that year. ALTERNATE aTTax currently fields players in Counter-Strike: Global Offensive'' and FIFA.

Counter-Strike: Global Offensive 

ALTERNATE aTTaX upset GODSENT on 8 September 2016 to qualify for ELeague Season 2.

In June 2016, Florian "syrsoN" Rische was added to the ALTERNATE aTTaX roster.

In December 2019, Mateusz "mantuu" Wilczewski was signed by OG. Sabit "mirbit" Coktasar was brought onto the team as a replacement along with Robin "ScrunK" Röpke, who now coaches the team.

Roster

Notable achievements 
 1st – WSVG Finals New York 
 1st – ESL Pro Series Season VIII 
 1st – WWCL Season #5 
 1st – GIGA Liga Grand Slam Season 1 
 2nd – ISC 2006 
 3rd – ESWC 2006
 1st – ESL Pro Series Season X

FIFA

Roster

References

External links 
 

2003 establishments in Germany
Esports teams based in Germany
Counter-Strike teams
FIFA (video game series) teams
Defunct and inactive Overwatch teams
Defunct and inactive PlayerUnknown's Battlegrounds teams
Esports teams established in 2003